Dendrobium moschatum Griff. is a synonym of Dendrobium pulchellum.Dendrobium moschatum, the musky-smelling dendrobium, is a species of orchid. It is native to the Himalayas (northern and eastern India, northern Bangladesh, Nepal, Bhutan, Assam, Yunnan), and Indochina (Vietnam, Thailand, Myanmar, Laos, Cambodia).I.Barua, Orchid Fl. Kamrup Distr. Assam: 160 (2001).Hossain, A.B.M. (2002). A Taxonomic report on the genus Dendrobium Sw.. Bangladesh Journal of Plant Taxonomy 9(2): 47-55.Lucksom, S.Z. (2007). The orchids of Sikkim and North East Himalaya: 1-984. S.Z.Lucksom, India.

Plicatol B is a phenanthrene that can be isolated from Dendrobium moschatum''.

References

External links 
 
 

moschatum
Orchids of Asia
Flora of Indo-China
Flora of the Indian subcontinent
Orchids of Yunnan
Plants described in 1800
Taxa named by Joseph Banks